The  Chrysler VH Valiant  is an automobile which was produced by Chrysler Australia from June 1971 to March 1973. It replaced the VG series Valiant and was the first Valiant model to be a uniquely Australian design.

Model range
The VH series Valiant was offered in the following models.

 Valiant sedan
 Valiant Ranger sedan
 Valiant Ranger station wagon
 Valiant Ranger XL sedan
 Valiant Ranger XL station wagon
 Valiant Ranger XL hardtop
 Valiant Hemi Pacer sedan
 Valiant Regal sedan
 Valiant Regal station wagon
 Valiant Regal hardtop
 Valiant Regal 770 sedan
 Valiant Regal 770 hardtop
 Valiant Charger coupe
 Valiant Charger XL coupe
 Valiant Charger R/T coupe
 Valiant Charger 770 coupe
 Valiant Charger 770 SE coupe
 Dodge utility
 Valiant utility
 Valiant Ranger utility

Sedan and station wagon models were introduced in June 1971, followed by the Charger coupes in August, the coupe utility models in September, and the 2-door hardtops in November.

Changes
The VH Valiant featured an entirely new body which was larger and more roomy than that of its VG series predecessor. The VH Hardtop models used body panels that were made entirely in Australia, unlike the previous VG Hardtops which had used imported sheet metal for all panels rear of the windscreen. The hardtops now rode on a 115-inch wheelbase, 4 inches longer than that on sedans and wagons. The Valiant Charger, which made its debut as part of the VH series used a 105-inch wheelbase.
From 1973 Australian regulations required amber turn signals be fitted to the front of all passenger vehicles, as well as the rear. This meant the combined park light/turn signals with clear lenses fitted to the VH were no longer legal. As a result 1973 build VH series cars were fitted with amber turn signals in place of the clear lenses, and park light were relocated to the panel below the front bumper.

Engines and transmissions
Chrysler Australia’s “Hemi 6” straight six engine was offered in three displacements, 215 cid (3.5 litre), 245 cid (4.0 litre) and 265 cid (4.3 litre). and a 318 cid V8 was also available. A 340 cid V8 was fitted to the Charger 770SE E55 model which was released in October 1972. 3 speed manual and 3 speed automatic transmissions were offered initially with a 4 speed manual available on Charger models from June 1972.

New Zealand production
Local importer Todd Motors assembled a VH sedan and Charger line using around 40% local content and unique specifications. The column shift manual or automatic front bench seat Ranger XL had exterior trim the same as the Australian base Ranger (no door frame or wheel arch brightwork, no tail lamp embellishment), unique local seat design and upholstery and a two barrel version of the 245 Hemi engine. The Regal 770 had separate front seats, 265 Hemi with floor console shift automatic or 318V8 and a standard delete option vinyl roof. The Charger was assembled only as a 770 with the console automatic and lacked the Australian version’s reclining front seats and rear overriders. Early production had one piece front door glass and opening rear side windows; due to sealing problems, this was changed to front quarterlights (an Australian factory option) and fixed rear side glass.

South African production
VH Valiants were assembled at Silverton, near Pretoria in South Africa using Australian bodies, electrics and trim and locally sourced mechanical components including a 225 cid engine. Prior to 1971 South African Valiants had been sourced from Canada. Local versions were sold as the Chrysler Valiant Rebel, Rebel 660, Regal, Charger Coupé, and Chrysler VIP. Station wagons were also available of the Rebel and Regal. For 1973 the Dodge SE (for "Special Edition") appeared, a luxury version with different front and rear treatment, vinyl roof, full equipment and a  version of the slant-six engine. Aside from the six-cylinder engine, the Dodge SE was very similar to the Australian-market Chrysler by Chrysler.

Production and replacement
A total of 67,800 VH Valiants were built prior to its replacement by the VJ Valiant range in 1973.

Chrysler by Chrysler

In November 1971, Chrysler Australia introduced the CH series Chrysler by Chrysler, which was a long wheelbase, luxury model developed from the VH Valiant. It was offered in 4-door sedan and 2-door hardtop bodystyles with a choice of 265 cid six and 360 cid V8 engines.

References

Cars of Australia
Valiant vehicles
Valiant
Cars introduced in 1971
1970s cars